The Clinical Dementia Rating or CDR is a numeric scale used to quantify the severity of symptoms of dementia (i.e. its 'stage').

Scale
Using a structured-interview protocol developed by Charles Hughes, Leonard Berg, John C. Morris and other colleagues at Washington University School of Medicine, a qualified health professional assesses a patient's cognitive and functional performance in six areas: memory, orientation, judgment & problem solving, community affairs, home & hobbies, and personal care. Scores in each of these are combined to obtain a composite score ranging from 0 through 3. Clinical Dementia Rating Assignment
Qualitative equivalences are as follows:NACC Clinical Dementia Rating

CDR is credited with being able to discern very mild impairments, but its weaknesses include the amount of time it takes to administer, its ultimate reliance on subjective assessment, and relative inability to capture changes over time.

Validity
While the assessment is ultimately subjective in nature, recent studies have suggested a very high interrater reliability. Thus the CDR is a reliable and valid tool for assessing and staging dementia.

Importance

With increasing clinical focus on dementia, there is likewise increasing interested in pharmacology in the development of drugs to halt, or slow the progression of dementia-related illness such as Alzheimer's Disease. Therefore, early and accurate diagnosis of dementia and staging can be essential to proper clinical care. Without the ability to reliably assess dementia across the board, the misuse of anti-dementia compounds could have negative consequences, such as patients receiving the wrong medication, or not receiving treatment in the early stages of dementia when it is most needed.

References

Cognitive disorders
Neuropsychological tests
Memory tests
Cognitive impairment and dementia screening and assessment tools